Bart de Block (born 22 October 1968 in Ghent) is a professional Belgian ballet dancer known for his pointework. He is also a ballet teacher (pointwork, pas-de-deux), choreographer and balletmaster.

Personal life
Bart de Block was born on 22 October 1968 in Gent, Belgium. His mother was a nursing supervisor and his father a schoolmaster. Both his brother and sister are now engineers.

Noticing a strong ability to move to music, his mother encouraged him to take dance lessons locally at age 9. His teacher suggested his ability could be improved in Antwerp at the Academy of Royal Ballet of Flanders, which he joined at 11. He would later leave it at age 18, having pursued an advanced ballet course including three years of Graham technique, classical dance, and, of course, regular academic courses. He won several medals in Lausanne, Jackson Mississippi, Houlgate and earned a High school diploma from the Stedelijk Institute in Antwerp (now known as Royal Balletschool of Antwerp).

Career
1986–1987
Royal Ballet of Flanders, Antwerp, Belgium as a member of the "corps de ballet"

1987–1995
Deutsche Oper Berlin, Berlin, Germany 
as the principal dancer, working with, most notably: Maurice Béjart, Marc Bogaerts, Valery Panov, Sir Kenneth McMillan, John Neumeier, Peter Schaufuss, Karole Armitage, Bill T. Jones, Moses Pendleton, Stephen Petronio, Nacho Duato, Christopher Bruce, Lucinda Childs – guest with the Kirov ballet, St-Petersburg, dancing Albrecht in Giselle

1995–1997
Ballet Trockadero, New-York, USA as the principal dancer

1997–1999
Mark Baldwin Dance Company, London, England as the principal dancer but also as the director's assistant

1999–2001
Royal Ballet of Flanders, Antwerp, Belgium as the principal dancer and also as an administration member

2002–2003
Jeugd & Dans Company, Antwerp, Belgium as the artistic coordinator

2003–2007
Les Ballets Gradiva, New York, USA as a guest

Principal roles

Agon – (Balanchine) in the First pas de deux
Cinderella – (Valery Panov) as the Prince
Cruel Garden – (Christopher Bruce) as Negro
Duende – (Nacho Duato) in the Principal role 
Different Drummer – (Sir K.MacMillan) as Jesus
Einhorn – (John Neuemeier) in the title role 
Flowerfestival – (A.Bournonville) in the pas de deux
Firebird – (M.Bejart) in the title role
Five Tangos – (Hans Van Manen) in the Principal role
Folk Tale – (P.Schaufuss) in the Title role
Four Temperaments – (G.Balanchine) as the Phlegmatic
Galaperformance – (A. Tudor) as one of the French couple
Giselle – (P.Schaufuss) as Albrecht
La Fille mal Gardee – in the Principale role
La Valse – (G.Balanchine) as the soloist
Land – (C.Bruce) in the Principal role
Laytext – (S.Petronio) in the Principal role
Le Corsaire – performing a mixed Pas de deux
Leaves are fading – (A. Tudor) in the Principal role
Le Sacre du Printemps – (M.Bejart) as the young warrior
Les Intermittences du Coeur – (R. Petit) as a Young Proust and Morel
Liebestod – (V.Panov) in the Title role
Moves – (V.Panov) as Michael Jackson
Notre Dame de Paris – (R.Petit) as Frollo
Onegin – (J.Cranko) as Lenski
Percussion for six men – (V.Nebrada) in the Bongo variation
Paquita – (Vinogradov) in the Principal role
Petruschka – (M.Fokine) in the Title role
Petruschka – (H.Mandafounis) in the Title role
Ring um den Ring – (M.Bejart) as Loge 
Romeo and Juliet – (V.Panov) as Mercutio 
Sleeping Beauty – (P.Schaufuss) as Carabosse
Swanlake – (K.MacMillan) as a Neapolitan 
Swanlake – (P.Schaufuss) as Rothbart 
Swansong – (C.Bruce) in the Principal role 
Symphony in C – (G.Balanchine) in the First & Third
Tannhauser – (V.Panov) in the Pas de deux
The dog is us – (K.Armitage) in the Principal role
The Dream is over – (C.Bruce) as John Lennon
The Idiot – (V.Panov) as Ganja
Theme and Variations – (G.Balanchine) in the Principal role
The Opening – (B.T.Jones) in the Principal role
Tschaikowsky pas de deux – (G.Balanchine) 
Tutuguri – (Moses Pendleton) in the Title role
Who Cares! – (G.Balanchine) in the Principal role
The Legend of Joseph – (Mark Baldwin) in the Principal role
Tango Fiesta – (Maurizio Weinrot) in the Principal role
The Nutcracker – (A. Prokovsky) as the Prince
The Emperor's Dream – (Mark Bogaerts) as The Emperor
Carmina Burana – (Maurizio Weinrot) in the Principal role

Roles "en pointe"
Ballet repertoire in point shoes

M-Piece – (Mark Baldwin)  – Solo
Song of a Nightingale – (Mark Baldwin) in the title role
The Demon – (Mark Baldwin)  in the title role
Sleeping Beauty – (Peter Schaufuss) as Carabosse
The Dog is us – (Karole Armitage) in the principal role
Swan Lake – (After Petipa) as Odette
Swan Lake – (After Petipa) as Odile
Grand pas Classique – (Victor Gsovsky)
Paquita – (E.Kunikova after Petipa) in the principal role
Stars and Stripes – (Robert Lafosse) in the principal role
Star Spangled Ballerina – (Marcus Galante) in the principal role
Nutcracker – (V.Trevino after Petipa) as the Sugar Plum fairy
Near the Middle – (V.Trevino after Forsythe) in the principal role
Satanella – (M.Petipa) pas de deux

References
 

Belgian male ballet dancers
1968 births
Living people
Entertainers from Ghent